Juya, born Qiemoju, was a chanyu of the Xiongnu Empire. The brother and successor of Souxie, he reigned from 12 to 8 BC. Juya sent his son Wuyidang to Chang'an. Juya died in 8 BC and was succeeded by his brother, Wuzhuliu.

Footnotes

References

Bichurin N.Ya., "Collection of information on peoples in Central Asia in ancient times", vol. 1, Sankt Petersburg, 1851, reprint Moscow-Leningrad, 1950

Taskin B.S., "Materials on Sünnu history", Science, Moscow, 1968, p. 31 (In Russian)

Chanyus
1st-century BC rulers in Asia

8 BC deaths